Tabernaemontana alternifolia is a species of plant in the family Apocynaceae. It is endemic to India.

Taxonomy
The name Tabernaemontana heyneana Wall. has often been used for this species, and a proposal was made to conserve that name so that it would be used instead of T. alternifolia. Arguments made for conservation were that the type of the species was not a specimen but an illustration, and that the plant has opposite leaves, not alternate leaves as alternifolia implies. However, the proposal was rejected, and the correct name of this species is the original name, T. alternifolia.

References

External links
BIOTIK database entry

alternifolia
Endemic flora of India (region)
Near threatened flora of Asia
Plants described in 1753
Taxa named by Carl Linnaeus
Taxonomy articles created by Polbot
Taxobox binomials not recognized by IUCN